The following were the national records in the sport of athletics in Czechoslovakia maintained by the Czechoslovak Athletics Federation until the country's dissolution in 1993.

Outdoor

Key to tables:
+ = en route to a longer distance

h = hand timing

# = not ratified by federation

Mx = mark was made in a mixed race

OT = oversized track (> 200m in circumference)

Men

Women

Indoor

Men

Women

References

General
 Czech Records 
 Slovak Records
 Czech Indoor All Comers Records 

Czechoslovak
Records